Harley is a civil parish in Shropshire, England.  It contains 15 listed buildings that are recorded in the National Heritage List for England.  All the listed buildings are designated at Grade II, the lowest of the three grades, which is applied to "buildings of national importance and special interest".  The parish contains the village of Harley and the surrounding countryside.  Most of the listed buildings are houses, farmhouses and farm buildings, many of which are timber framed, or have timber framed cores.  The other listed buildings are a church, memorials in the churchyard, an animal pound, and a milepost.


Buildings

References

Citations

Sources

Lists of buildings and structures in Shropshire